1995–96 Országos Bajnokság I (men's water polo) was the 90th water polo championship in Hungary.

First stage 

Pld - Played; W - Won; L - Lost; PF - Points for; PA - Points against; Diff - Difference; Pts - Points.

Championship Playoff

Sources 
Gyarmati Dezső: Aranykor (Hérodotosz Könyvkiadó és Értékesítő Bt., Budapest, 2002.)

Seasons in Hungarian water polo competitions
1995 in water polo
1995 in Hungarian sport
1996 in water polo
1996 in Hungarian sport